Before the Acts of Union 1707, the barons of the shire or sheriffdom of Argyll elected commissioners to represent them in the unicameral Parliament of Scotland and in the Convention of the Estates. The number of commissioners was increased from two to three in 1693.

From 1708 Argyllshire was represented by one Member of Parliament in the House of Commons of Great Britain.

List of shire commissioners

 1593: Sir Duncan Campbell of Glenorchy
 1628–33 : Sir Duncan Campbell of Auchinbreck
 1639–41, : Sir Robert Campbell of Glenorchy
 1639–41: Sir Duncan Campbell
 1643–44: Sir Robert Campbell of Glenorchy
 1643: Sir Duncan Campbell
 1644–49: Sir Robert Campbell of Glenorchy
 1646–49: James Campbell of Ardkinglass
 1649: Sir Dugald Campbell of Auchinbreck
 1661–63: Sir John Campbell of Glenorchy
 1661–63: John Campbell of Ardchattane 
 1665 convention, 1667 convention: no representatives
 1669–74: Sir John Campbell of Glenorchy
 1669–74:  Sir John Campbell of Carrick
 1678 convention: Sir John Campbell of Carrick 
 1678 convention: Alexander Campbell of Glenstrae 
 1681–82: Sir John Campbell of Carrick
 1681–82: Sir John Campbell of Sockoth 
 1685–86: Lauchlan Maclean of Brolas, baillie
 1685–86: Archibald Lamont of Inneryne 
 1689 convention, 1689–1702: Sir John Campbell of Carrick 
 1689 convention, 1689–1700: Sir Duncan Campbell of Auchinbreck
 1693–1702: Sir Colin Campbell of Ardkinglass
 1702–07: John Campbell of Mammore 
 1702–07: Sir James Campbell of Auchinbreck
 1702–07: James Campbell of Ardkinglass

References

See also
 List of constituencies in the Parliament of Scotland at the time of the Union

Constituencies of the Parliament of Scotland (to 1707)
Constituencies disestablished in 1707
1707 disestablishments in Scotland
Politics of Argyll and Bute
History of Argyll and Bute